The Zambia women's national basketball team represents Zambia in international competitions. It is administrated by the Zambia Basketball Association (ZBA).

They joined the 2011 Afrobasket for Women qualification.

See also
 Zambia women's national under-19 basketball team
 Zambia women's national under-17 basketball team
 Zambia women's national 3x3 team

References

External links
Zambia Basketball Association
Zambia Basketball Records at FIBA Archive
Presentation on Facebook

 
Women's national basketball teams